Akane Yamao (born September 30, 1974, Kiyose, Tokyo) is a Japanese rhythmic gymnast.

Yamao competed for Japan in the rhythmic gymnastics individual all-around competition at the 1996 Summer Olympics in Atlanta. There she was 19th in the qualification round and advanced to the semifinal, where she placed 18th and did not advance to the final of 10 competitors.

References

External links 
 
 

1974 births
Living people
Japanese rhythmic gymnasts
Gymnasts at the 1996 Summer Olympics
Olympic gymnasts of Japan
People from Kiyose, Tokyo
Gymnasts from Tokyo
20th-century Japanese women